The Venice Film Festival or Venice International Film Festival ("International Exhibition of Cinematographic Art of the Venice Biennale") is an annual film festival held in Venice, Italy. It is the world's oldest film festival and one of the "Big Five" International film festivals worldwide, which include the Big Three European Film Festivals, alongside the Toronto Film Festival in Canada and the Sundance Film Festival in the United States. The Festivals are internationally acclaimed for giving creators the artistic freedom to express themselves through film. In 1951, FIAPF formally accredited the festival. 

Founded by the National Fascist Party in Venice in August 1932, the festival is part of the Venice Biennale, one of the world's oldest exhibitions of art, created by the Venice City Council on 19 April 1893. The range of work at the Venice Biennale now covers Italian and international art, architecture, dance, music, theatre, and cinema. These works are experienced at separate exhibitions: the International Art Exhibition, the International Festival of Contemporary Music, the International Theatre Festival, the International Architecture Exhibition, the International Festival of Contemporary Dance, the International Kids' Carnival, and the annual Venice Film Festival, which is arguably the best-known of all the events.

The festival is held in late August or early September on the island of the Lido in the Venice Lagoon. Screenings take place in the historic Palazzo del Cinema on the Lungomare Marconi. The festival continues to be one of the world's most popular and fastest-growing.

The 79th Venice International Film Festival was held from 31 August to 10 September 2022.

History

1930s 
During the 1930s, the government and Italian citizens were heavily interested in film. Of the money Italians spent on cultural or sporting events, most of it went for movies. The majority of films screened in Italy were American, which led to government involvement in the film industry and the yearning to celebrate Italian culture in general. With this in mind, the Venice International Film Festival was created by Giuseppe Volpi, Luciano de Feo, and Antonio Maraini in 1932. Volpi, a statesman, wealthy businessman, and avid fascist who had been Benito Mussolini's minister of finance, was appointed president of the Venice Biennale the same year. Maraini served as the festival's secretary general, and de Feo headed its executive committee.

On the night of 6 August 1932, the festival opened with a screening of the American film Dr. Jekyll and Mr. Hyde on the terrace of the Excelsior Palace Hotel. A total of nine countries participated in the festival, which ended on 21 August.

No awards were given at the first festival, but an audience referendum was held to determine which films and performances were most praiseworthy. The French film À Nous la Liberté was voted the Film Più Divertente (the Funniest Film). The Sin of Madelon Claudet was chosen the Film Più Commovente (the Most Moving Film) and its star, Helen Hayes, the best actress. Most Original Film (Film dalla fantasia più originale) was given to Dr. Jekyll and Mr. Hyde, and its leading man, Fredric March, was voted best actor.

Despite the success of the first festival, it did not return in 1933. In 1934, the festival was declared to be an annual event, and participation grew from nine countries to seventeen. That year the festival also gave its first official awards, namely the Mussolini Cup for Best Italian Film, the Mussolini Cup for Best Foreign Film, and the Corporations Ministry Cup. Seventeen awards were given: fourteen to films and three to individuals. Five films received honorable mentions.

The third installment of the festival in 1935 was headed by its first artistic director, Ottavio Croze, who maintained this position until World War II. The following year, a jury was added to the festival's governing body; it had no foreign members. The majority of funds for the festival came from the Ministry of Popular Culture, with other portions from the Biennale and the city of Venice.

The year 1936 marked another important development in the festival. A law crafted by the Ministry of Popular Culture made the festival an autonomous entity, separate from the main Venice Biennale. This allowed additional fascist organizations, such as the Department of Cinema and the Fascist National Federation of Entertainment Industries, to take control of the festival.

The fifth year of the festival saw the establishment of its permanent home. Designed and completed in 1937, the Palazzo del Cinema was built on the Lido. The Palazzo has since been the site for every Venice Film Festival, with the exception of the three years from 1940 to 1942, when the festival was moved away from Venice for fear of bombing. However, Venice received almost no damage during that time.

1940s

The 1940s represent one of the most difficult moments for the festival itself. Nazi propaganda movie Heimkehr was presented in 1941 winning an award from the Italian Ministry of Popular Culture. With the advent of the conflict the situation degenerated to such a point that the editions of 1940, 1941 and 1942, subsequently are considered as if they did not happen because they were carried out in places far away from Lido. Additionally, the festival was renamed the Italian-German Film Festival (Manifestazione Cinematografica Italo-Germanica) in 1940. The festival carried this title until 1942 when the festival was suspended due to war.

The festival resumed full speed in 1946, after the war. For the first time, the 1946 edition was held in the month of September, in accordance with an agreement with the newly reborn Cannes Film Festival, which had just held its first review in the spring of that year. With the return to normality, Venice once again became a great icon of the film world.

In 1947 the festival was held in the courtyard of the Doge's Palace, a most magnificent backdrop for hosting a record 90 thousand participants. The 1947 festival is widely considered one of the most successful editions in the history of the festival.

Development and closure

In 1963 the winds of change blew strongly during Luigi Chiarini’s directorship of the festival (1963–1968). During the years of his directorship, Chiarini aspired to renew the spirit and the structures of the festival, pushing for a total reorganization of the entire system. For six years the festival followed a consistent path, according to the rigid criteria put in place for the selection of works in competition, and took a firm stand against the political pressures and interference of more and more demanding movie studios, preferring the artistic quality of films to the growing commercialization of the film industry.

The social and political unrest of 1968 had strong repercussions on the Venice Bienniale. From 1969 to 1979 no prizes were awarded and the festival returned to the non-competitiveness of the first edition due to the Years of Lead. In 1973, 1977 and 1978, the festival was not even held. The Golden Lion didn't make its return until 1980.

The rebirth

The long-awaited rebirth came in 1979, thanks to the new director Carlo Lizzani (1979–1983), who decided to restore the image and value the festival had lost over the last decade. The 1979 edition laid the foundation for the restoration of international prestige. In an attempt to create a more modern image of the festival, the neo-director created a committee of experts to assist in selecting the works and to increase the diversity of submissions to the festival.

In 2004 an independent and parallel film festival, Giornate degli Autori, was created in association with the festival.

To celebrate the 70th edition of the festival, in 2013 the new section "Venezia 70 – Future Reloaded" was created.

 During the recent years, under the direction of Alberto Barbera, the festival established itself as an Oscars launchpad, increasing the presence of American movies and hosting the world premieres of Academy Award-winning films such as Gravity (2013), Birdman (2014), Spotlight (2015), La La Land (2016), The Shape of Water (2017), The Favourite (2018), Roma (2018), Joker (2019), Nomadland (2020) and Dune (2021).

In 2017 a new section for virtual-reality (VR) films was introduced.

In 2018 Roma by Alfonso Cuarón won the Golden Lion and became the first ever movie produced by Netflix to be awarded in a major film festival.

Direction
The president of the Venice Biennale represents the festival in front of its financial partner, the public authorities, and the media. He is chosen by the Italian Ministry of Cultural Heritage every 4 years. The current president is Roberto Cicutto, appointed on 27 January 2020. Previously the post has been held for 12 years by Paolo Baratta (2008–2020).

The director of the Festival is responsible for coordinating the events and is chosen by the president of the Venice Biennale and its delegates. The current director Alberto Barbera was appointed on 27 December 2011. On 27 October 2020 Barbera's term was renewed for 4 more years until 2024. He previously held the position from 1998 to 2002.

Festival programme 
The Venice Film Festival is organized in various sections:

 Official Selection - The main event of the festival.
 In Competition - About 21 films competing for the Golden Lion.
 Out of Competition - Maximum of 18 important works of the year will be presented but do not compete for the main prize.
 Orizzonti - The films that represent the latest trends in international cinema by young talents will be presented.
 Venice Classics - Selection of the finest restoration of classic films will be featured.
 Sconfini - Maximum of 10 works that typically includes art house and genre films, experimental works, TV series and cross-media productions will be featured.
 Venice Virtual Reality - Maximum of 30 works in competition and out of competition will be presented.
 Independent and Parallel Sections - These are alternative programmes dedicated to discover other aspects of cinema. 
 International Critics' Week - No more than 8 debut films will be screened with its own regulations.
 Giornate degli Autori - No more than 12 films will be promoted by ANAC and 100 Autori Association.

Awards

The Film Festival's current awards are:

Official selection: In competition

 Golden Lion (Leone d'Oro), awarded to the best film screened in competition at the festival
 See list of winners at Golden Lion
 Grand Jury Prize, awarded to the second best film screened in competition at the festival
 See list of winners at Grand Jury Prize (Venice Film Festival)
 Silver Lion (Leone d'Argento), awarded to the best director in the competitive section
 See list of winners at Silver Lion
 Special Jury Prize, awarded to the third best film screened in competition at the festival
 See list of winners at Special Jury Prize (Venice Film Festival)
 Volpi Cup (Coppa Volpi), awarded to the best actor/actress
 See – Volpi Cup for Best Actor
 See – Volpi Cup for Best Actress
 Golden Osella, awarded for the Best Screenplay and/or for the Best Technical Contribution (cinematography, music, etc.)
 See list of winners at Golden Osella
 There are other awards that also recognize acting performances:
 Marcello Mastroianni Award, instituted in 1998 in honor of the great Italian actor Marcello Mastroianni who died in 1996. The award was created to acknowledge an emerging actor or actress
 See list of winners at Marcello Mastroianni Award
 Special Lion, awarded for an overall work to a director or actor of a film presented in the main competition section.

Orizzonti section (Horizons)
This section is open to all "custom-format" works, with a wider view towards new trends in the expressive languages that converge in film.

Starting from the 67th edition of the festival, four awards of the Orizzonti section have been established:
 The Orizzonti Award for Feature Films
 The Special Orizzonti Jury Prize (for feature films)
 The Orizzonti Award for Short Film
 The Orizzonti Award for Medium-length Film
More awards were added in the following years:

 The Orizzonti Award for Best Director
 The Orizzonti Award for Best Actor
 The Orizzonti Award for Best Actress
 The Orizzonti Award for Best Screenplay

Giornate degli Autori 
The Giornate degli Autori (formerly Venice Days) is an independent and parallel section founded in 2004 in association with Venice Film Festival. It is modeled on the Directors' Fortnight at the Cannes Film Festival. Anac and 100autori which are both associations of Italian film directors and authors are engaged to support and promote the Giornate.

The awards under this sections are:

 Giornate Degli Autori (GDA) Award
 Label Europa Cinema Award
 BNP Paribas People's Choice Award

Lion of the Future (Luigi De Laurentiis) 

All the debut feature films in the various competitive sections in the Venice Film Festival, whether in Official Selection or Independent and Parallel Sections, are eligible for this award. The winner will be awarded a prize of US$100,000, which to be divided equally between the director and the producer.

Glory to the Filmmaker Award

Jaeger-LeCoultre Glory to the Filmmaker Award, organized in collaboration with Jaeger-LeCoultre  (2006-2020) and Cartier (2021- today). It is dedicated to personalities who have made a significant contribution to contemporary cinema.

This is the list of winners:

Past awards

Mussolini Cup (Coppa Mussolini)
The Mussolini Cup was the top award from 1934 to 1942 for Best Italian and Best Foreign Film. Named after Italy's dictator Benito Mussolini, it was abandoned upon his ousting in 1943.

Mussolini Cup for Best Italian film

Mussolini Cup for Best foreign film

Great Gold Medals of the National Fascist Association for Entertainment
"Le Grandi Medaglie d’Oro dell’Associazione Nazionale Fascista dello Spettacolo" in Italian.

This was awarded to Best Actor and Best Actress. It was later replaced by the Volpi Cup for actors and actresses.

The first time this prize was awarded to Katharine Hepburn for her role in Little Women by George Cukor.

Audience Referendum
In the first edition of the festival in 1932, due to the lack of a jury and the awarding of official prizes, a list of acknowledgements was decided by popular vote, a tally determined by the number of people flocking to the films, and announced by the Organizing Committee. From this, the Best Director was declared – Russian Nikolai Ekk for the film Road to Life, while the film by René Clair À Nous la Liberté was voted Best Film.

Award for Best Director

See also

 Venice Biennale
 Rome Film Festival

References

Further reading

External links

 La Biennale di Venezia – Official website 
 Venice International Film Festival history at La Biennale di Venezia website
 

 
Film festivals in Italy
Film
Film festivals established in 1932
Recurring events established in 1932
1932 establishments in Italy
20th-century establishments in Venice
Italian traditions